Charles William Nevill (7 May 1815 – 7 June 1888) was a Welsh owner of a copper smelting company in Llanelli, and a Conservative Party politician. He was elected at the 1874 general election as the Member of Parliament (MP) for Carmarthen Boroughs, but resigned from Parliament two years later, accepting the Stewardship of the Chiltern Hundreds in 1876.

Family life
Charles William Nevill's grandfather was Charles Nevill (1753–1813) who founded a copper smelters in Llanelli which was passed to his son Richard Janion Nevill (1785–1856).  Nevill was born in Llanelli in a house near the copperworks and was educated at Llanelli Boys' Grammar School and Rugby School. He took over the family business on his father's death.

Public life
As a prominent industrialist it was natural that Nevill would become involved in local government and in 1850 became one of the first members of the Llanelly Board of Health.

Member of Parliament
In 1874, the octogenarian member for the Carmarthen Boroughs, Sir John Stepney, announced his decision to retire. Almost immediately, his son, Arthur, emerged as the new Liberal candidate. Arthur Stepney was regarded as an unlikely radical, and there as general surprise at his declaration of support for policies such as the disestablishment of the Anglican church in Wales.  Nevill, who has resisted calls to oppose the elder Stepney in 1868, now entered the fray.  His candidature was strengthened by his status as 'one of the largest employers of labour' in the locality.

One of the features of the election was that nonconformist ministers in Llanelli sought to encourage opposition to Nevill.

Nevill's popularity in Llanelli led to his election, although he did not command a majority in the county town of Carmarthen, which had a smaller electorate.

During his short parliamentary career, Nevill did not always support Conservative policy. He voted in favour of the extension of the county franchise, and also supported Osborne Morgan's Burials' Bill.

On 19 July 1876, Nevill indicated his intention to resign as an MP, in a letter to the Vicar of Carmarthen, the Rev Latimer M. Jones. A number of possible candidates were initially mentioned, both Conservatives and Liberals. However, within a short time it became apparent that Arthur Stepney would succeed him. At the subsequent by-election, Stepney was returned unopposed.

Later life and death
At Llanelli, Nevill played a prominent part in public life. He was a magistrate for over fifty years and served as chairman of both the Board of Guardians and Local Board of Health. Nevill died in 1888 at the age of 73.

References

Sources

Online
Oxford Dictionary of National Biography, Nevill family (per. c.1793–1973), copper smelters and colliery proprietors by R. Protheroe Jones and M. V. Symons.

External links 

1815 births
1888 deaths
Conservative Party (UK) MPs for Welsh constituencies
Members of the Parliament of the United Kingdom for Carmarthenshire constituencies
UK MPs 1874–1880
Deputy Lieutenants of Carmarthenshire
19th-century Welsh businesspeople
British mining businesspeople
People from Llanelli
People educated at Llanelli Boys' Grammar School
People educated at Rugby School